Saint-Constant (Languedocien: Sant Constant) is a former commune in the Cantal department in south-central France. On 1 January 2016, it was merged into the new commune Saint-Constant-Fournoulès.

Population

See also
Communes of the Cantal department

References

Former communes of Cantal
Cantal communes articles needing translation from French Wikipedia
Populated places disestablished in 2016